Conference on Web and Internet Economics (WINE) (prior to 2013, The Workshop on Internet & Network Economics) is an interdisciplinary workshop devoted to the analysis of algorithmic and economic problems arising in the Internet and the World Wide Web.  The submissions are peer reviewed and the proceedings of the conference is published by Springer-Verlag. The conference has been held every year since 2005. Previous sessions include:

 WINE 2005: Hong Kong, China : Proceedings: Lecture Notes in Computer Science 3828 Springer 2005, 
 WINE 2006: Patras, Greece : Proceedings: Lecture Notes in Computer Science 4286 Springer 2006, 
 WINE 2007: San Diego, CA, USA : Proceedings: Lecture Notes in Computer Science 4858 Springer 2007, 
 WINE 2008: Shanghai, China : Proceedings: Lecture Notes in Computer Science 5385 Springer 2008, 
 WINE 2009: Rome, Italy : Proceedings: Lecture Notes in Computer Science 5929 Springer 2009, 
 WINE 2010: Stanford, CA, USA : Proceedings: Lecture Notes in Computer Science 6484 Springer 2010, 
 WINE 2011: Singapore : Proceedings: Lecture Notes in Computer Science 7090 Springer 2011, 
 WINE 2012: Liverpool, UK : Proceedings: Lecture Notes in Computer Science 7695 Springer 2012, 
 WINE 2013: Cambridge, MA, USA : Proceedings: Lecture Notes in Computer Science 8289 Springer 2013, 
 WINE 2014: Beijing, China : Proceedings: Lecture Notes in Computer Science 8877 Springer 2014, 
 WINE 2015: Amsterdam, The Netherlands : Proceedings: Lecture Notes in Computer Science 9470 Springer 2015, 
 WINE 2016: Montreal, Canada : Proceedings: Lecture Notes in Computer Science 10123 Springer 2016, 
 WINE 2017: Bangalore, India : Proceedings: Lecture Notes in Computer Science 10660 Springer 2017, 
 WINE 2018: Oxford, UK : Proceedings: Lecture Notes in Computer Science 11316 Springer 2018, 
 WINE 2019: New York, NY, USA : Proceedings: Lecture Notes in Computer Science 11920 Springer 2019, 
 WINE 2020: Beijing, China : Proceedings: Lecture Notes in Computer Science 12495 Springer 2020, 
 WINE 2021: Potsdam, Germany : Proceedings: Lecture Notes in Computer Science 13112 Springer 2022, 
 WINE 2022: Troy, NY, USA : Proceedings: Lecture Notes in Computer Science 13778 Springer 2022,

Sources
 WINE at DBLP
 https://cs.mcgill.ca/~wine2016/history.html
 http://lcm.csa.iisc.ernet.in/wine2017/papers.html

Computer networking conferences
Recurring events established in 2005